Hans Vilhelm Cederfeld de Simonsen (1777–1836) was a Danish landowner and government official.  He served as the Diocesan Governor and County Governor of several different counties in Denmark and Norway.

His father was Lorentz Christian Ernst Cederfeld de Simonsen, who in 1776 had married Anne Sophie Simonsen and thereby fulfilled the condition to take possession of the Erholm Manor on the island of Funen. He became a student in 1794 with a Cand.jur. degree. He took a job in the Rentekammeret, a government agency in 1798. On 20 December 1805, he was appointed to be the County Governor of Lister og Mandals amt in Norway, when he was only 28 years old. In 1810, he was promoted to be the Diocesan Governor of Christianssand stiftamt (and concurrently the County Governor of Nedenæs amt). On 26 November 1811, he was transferred to Denmark where he became the Diocesan Governor of Lolland-Falster (and concurrently the County Governor of Maribo County). On 28 January 1812, he was made a Knight of the Order of the Dannebrog. On 12 April 1814 , he was appointed the Diocesan Governor of Fyens stiftamt (and concurrently the County Governor of Odense County). He continued in that role until his death on 5 May 1836.

He was married on 13 August 1814 in Borreby to Elisabeth Castenschiold, daughter of Lieutenant General Joachim Castenschiold in Borreby.

References

1777 births
1836 deaths
County governors of Norway